Urbain Edmond Alfred Charles Wallet (3 July 1899 – 9 December 1973) was a French footballer who played as a defender.

Biography 
Born in Montdidier, Somme, he spent his entire club career from 1916 to 1932 at Amiens SC.

Wallet earned 21 caps for the France national football team. His debut came on 22 March 1925 in a 7–0 friendly defeat to Italy in Turin. All of his caps were in friendlies apart from the 18th on 29 May 1928, in a 4–3 defeat to Italy at the Olympics in Amsterdam. He died in Belloy-sur-Somme.

References

1899 births
1973 deaths
People from Montdidier, Somme
Association football defenders
French footballers
France international footballers
Olympic footballers of France
Footballers at the 1928 Summer Olympics
Amiens SC players
Sportspeople from Somme (department)
Footballers from Hauts-de-France